Lesley Vance may refer to:

 Lesley Vance (American politician) (1939–2015), American politician
 Lesley Vance (artist) (born 1977), American artist